"Boom Boom" is a song by Ukrainian singer Loboda and Russian rapper Pharaoh. It was released on July 31, 2020 by Sony Music.

Track listing

Charts

Release history

Cover versions and other 
 The musicians of the band Kuwalda made a cover of this song in the style of industrial-metal with alternative lyrics dedicated to the dictatorship, and shot a video.
 American drag queen Katya Zamolodchikova recorded the song "Ding Dong!" for her debut EP Vampire Fitness. "Ding Dong!" is an homage to "Boom Boom".

References

2020 singles
2020 songs
Russian-language songs
Songs with feminist themes
Sony Music singles
Svetlana Loboda songs